The President's Plane Is Missing may refer to:

 The President's Plane Is Missing (novel)
 The President's Plane Is Missing (film)